Nikki Baggerman (born 17 October 1997) is a Dutch footballer who plays for Achilles Veen.

Club career
He made his Eerste Divisie debut for RKC Waalwijk on 7 April 2017 in a game against De Graafschap.

On 4 January 2022, Baggerman joined fifth-tier Hoofdklasse club Achilles Veen.

References

External links
 
 

1997 births
People from Monster
Living people
Dutch footballers
RKC Waalwijk players
SV TEC players
FC Dordrecht players
Achilles Veen players
Eerste Divisie players
Vierde Divisie players
Association football midfielders
Footballers from South Holland